Hariri Mohd Safii (born 18 January 1989) is a Terengganu footballer and currently playing for Terengganu City in Malaysia FAM League.

References

1989 births
Living people
Malaysian footballers
Terengganu FC players
Sabah F.C. (Malaysia) players
Negeri Sembilan FA players
Penang F.C. players
People from Terengganu
Association football defenders